The 2011–12 Golden State Warriors season was the 66th season of the franchise in the National Basketball Association (NBA), and the 50th anniversary of their time in the San Francisco Bay Area. The Warriors hired former NBA player and ESPN color commentator Mark Jackson as their head coach during the lockout, and finished with a 23–43 win–loss record. This was the last time the Warriors failed to qualify for the playoffs until 2020.

Draft

Preseason
Due to the 2011 NBA lockout negotiations, the programmed preseason schedule, along with the first two weeks of the regular season, were scrapped, and a two-game preseason was set for each team once the lockout concluded.

Pre-season

|- bgcolor="#ccffcc"
| 1
| December 17
| Sacramento
| 
| Stephen Curry (22)
| David Lee (8)
| Monta Ellis (8)
| Oracle Arena16,523
| 1–0
|- bgcolor="ffcccc"
| 2
| December 20
| @ Sacramento
| 
| David Lee (30)
| David Lee (13)
| Monta Ellis (6)
| Power Balance Pavilion12,425
| 1-1

Regular season

Standings

Division

Conference

Record vs. opponents

Game log

|- bgcolor=#ffcccc
| 1
| December 25
| L. A. Clippers
| 
| David Lee (21)
| David Lee (12)
| Monta Ellis (8)
| Oracle Arena19,596
| 0–1
|- bgcolor=#ccffcc
| 2
| December 26
| Chicago
| 
| Monta Ellis (26)
| Lee, Curry (7)
| Stephen Curry (10)
| Oracle Arena19,596
| 1–1
|- bgcolor=#ccffcc
| 3
| December 28
| New York
| 
| Monta Ellis (22)
| Kwame Brown (10)
| Monta Ellis (8)
| Oracle Arena19,596
| 2–1
|- bgcolor=#ffcccc
| 4
| December 31
| Philadelphia
| 
| Stephen Curry (21)
| Ekpe Udoh (9)
| Ish Smith (5)
| Oracle Arena19,084
| 2–2

|- bgcolor=#ffcccc
| 5
| January 2
| @ Phoenix
| 
| Monta Ellis (18)
| David Lee (9)
| Monta Ellis (11)
| US Airways Center14,793
| 2–3
|- bgcolor=#ffcccc
| 6
| January 4
| @ San Antonio
| 
| Monta Ellis (38)
| David Lee (10)
| Stephen Curry (8)
| AT&T Center16,751
| 2–4
|- bgcolor=#ffcccc
| 7
| January 6
| @ L. A. Lakers
| 
| Monta Ellis (18)
| David Lee (11)
| Monta Ellis (10)
| Staples Center18,997
| 2–5
|- bgcolor=#ffcccc
| 8
| January 7
| Utah
| 
| Monta Ellis (32)
| David Lee (15)
| Monta Ellis (6)
| Oracle Arena19,596
| 2–6
|- bgcolor=#ccffcc
| 9
| January 10
| Miami
| 
| Nate Robinson (24)
| David Lee (14)
| Nate Robinson (5)
| Oracle Arena19,596
| 3–6
|- bgcolor=#ffcccc
| 10
| January 12
| Orlando
| 
| Monta Ellis (30)
| David Lee (12)
| Monta Ellis (11)
| Oracle Arena17,754
| 3–7
|- bgcolor=#ffcccc
| 11
| January 14
| @ Charlotte
| 
| David Lee (24)
| David Lee (16)
| Monta Ellis (6)
| Time Warner Cable Arena16,112
| 3–8
|- bgcolor=#ccffcc
| 12
| January 15
| @ Detroit
| 
| David Lee (24)
| Dorell Wright (11)
| Monta Ellis (7)
| The Palace of Auburn Hills11,774
| 4–8
|- bgcolor=#ccffcc
| 13
| January 17
| @ Cleveland
| 
| David Lee (29)
| Andris Biedriņš (11)
| Nate Robinson (10)
| Quicken Loans Arena13,056
| 5–8
|- bgcolor=#ffcccc
| 14
| January 18
| @ New Jersey
| 
| Monta Ellis (30)
| David Lee (11)
| Nate Robinson (7)
| Prudential Center12,570
| 5–9
|- bgcolor=#ffcccc
| 15
| January 20
| Indiana
| 
| Monta Ellis (25)
| David Lee (14)
| Monta Ellis (6)
| Oracle Arena17,621
| 5–10
|- bgcolor=#ffcccc
| 16
| January 23
| Memphis
| 
| Monta Ellis (20)
| David Lee (12)
| Nate Robinson (6)
| Oracle Arena17,549
| 5–11
|- bgcolor=#ccffcc
| 17
| January 25
| Portland
| 
| Stephen Curry (32)
| Ekpe Udoh (7)
| Monta Ellis (12)
| Oracle Arena17,923
| 6–11
|- bgcolor=#ffcccc
| 18
| January 27
| Oklahoma City
| 
| Dorell Wright (23)
| Dorell Wright (9)
| Ellis, Curry  (6)
| Oracle Arena19,596
| 6–12
|- bgcolor=#ccffcc
| 19
| January 31
| Sacramento
| 
| Brandon Rush (20)
| Brandon Rush (6)
| Stephen Curry (8)
| Oracle Arena17,753
| 7–12

|- bgcolor=#ccffcc
| 20
| February 2
| Utah
| 
| Monta Ellis (33)
| David Lee (14)
| Stephen Curry (12)
| Oracle Arena18,123
| 8–12
|- bgcolor=#ffcccc
| 21
| February 4
| @ Sacramento
| 
| Dorell Wright (24)
| Lee, Biedriņš (5)
| Stephen Curry (9)
| Power Balance Pavilion16,411
| 8–13
|- bgcolor=#ffcccc
| 22
| February 7
| Oklahoma City
| 
| Monta Ellis (48)
| David Lee (11)
| Curry, Lee (10)
| Oracle Arena17,971
| 8–14
|- bgcolor=#ccffcc
| 23
| February 9
| @ Denver
| 
| Stephen Curry (36)
| Lee, Biedriņš (8)
| Stephen Curry (7)
| Pepsi Center14,960
| 9–14
|- bgcolor=#ccffcc
| 24
| February 12
| Houston
| 
| Monta Ellis (33)
| David Lee (13)
| Monta Ellis (7)
| Oracle Arena19,596
| 10–14
|- bgcolor=#ccffcc
| 25
| February 13
| Phoenix
| 
| David Lee (28)
| David Lee (12)
| Stephen Curry (5)
| Oracle Arena19,106
| 11–14
|- bgcolor=#ffcccc
| 26
| February 15
| Portland
| 
| David Lee (29)
| David Lee (11)
| Stephen Curry (8)
| Oracle Arena17,934
| 11–15
|- bgcolor=#ffcccc
| 27
| February 17
| @ Oklahoma City
| 
| David Lee (23)
| Dorell Wright (11)
| Ellis, Curry (4)
| Chesapeake Energy Arena18,203
| 11–16
|- bgcolor=#ffcccc
| 28
| February 18
| @ Memphis
| 
| Stephen Curry (36)
| David Lee (9)
| Ellis, Curry (6)
| FedEx Forum17,151
| 11–17
|- bgcolor=#ccffcc
| 29
| February 20
| L. A. Clippers
| 
| Monta Ellis (32)
| David Lee (13)
| Stephen Curry (6)
| Oracle Arena19,596
| 12–17
|- bgcolor=#ccffcc
| 30
| February 22
| @ Phoenix
| 
| Monta Ellis (26)
| Dominic McGuire (9)
| Monta Ellis (6)
| US Airways Center14,558
| 13–17
|- bgcolor=#ffcccc
| 31
| February 28
| @ Indiana
| 
| Ellis, Rush (14)
| Brandon Rush (7)
| Lee, Robinson (4)
| Bankers Life Fieldhouse12,111
| 13–18
|- bgcolor=#ccffcc
| 32
| February 29
| @ Atlanta
| 
| Monta Ellis (24)
| Dominic McGuire (15)
| Monta Ellis (8)
| Philips Arena13,049
| 14–18

|- bgcolor=#ffcccc
| 33
| March 2
| @ Philadelphia
| 
| David Lee (24)
| David Lee (15)
| Monta Ellis (7)
| Wells Fargo Center18,323
| 14–19
|- bgcolor=#ffcccc
| 34
| March 4
| @ Toronto
| 
| David Lee (22)
| David Lee (12)
| Monta Ellis (7)
| Air Canada Centre18,056
| 14–20
|- bgcolor=#ccffcc
| 35
| March 5
| @ Washington
| 
| Monta Ellis (25)
| David Lee (10)
| Monta Ellis (8)
| Verizon Center17,843
| 15–20
|- bgcolor=#ffcccc
| 36
| March 7
| Memphis
| 
| Ellis, Thompson (16)
| 3 players tied (6)
| Robinson, Udoh (4)
| Oracle Arena19,171
| 15–21
|- bgcolor=#ccffcc
| 37
| March 10
| Dallas
| 
| David Lee (25)
| David Lee (9)
| Monta Ellis (8)
| Oracle Arena19,596
| 16–21
|- bgcolor=#ccffcc
| 38
| March 11
| @ L. A. Clippers
| 
| Monta Ellis (21)
| David Lee (10)
| Monta Ellis (11)
| Staples Center19,183
| 17–21
|- bgcolor=#ccffcc
| 39
| March 13
| @ Sacramento
| 
| 3 players tied (17)
| Dorell Wright (10)
| Klay Thompson (5)
| Power Balance Pavilion12,011
| 18–21
|- bgcolor=#ffcccc
| 40
| March 14
| Boston
| 
| Klay Thompson (26)
| David Lee (8)
| Nate Robinson (11)
| Oracle Arena19,596
| 18–22
|- bgcolor=#ffcccc
| 41
| March 16
| Milwaukee
| 
| David Lee (22)
| David Lee (9)
| Nate Robinson (6)
| Oracle Arena19,596
| 18–23
|- bgcolor=#ffcccc
| 42
| March 17
| @ Utah
| 
| Nate Robinson (19)
| Dorell Wright (10)
| Nate Robinson (4)
| EnergySolutions Arena17,854
| 18–24
|- bgcolor=#ffcccc
| 43
| March 19
| Minnesota
| 
| David Lee (25)
| Lee, McGuire (9)
| Nate Robinson (7)
| Oracle Arena19,596
| 18–25
|- bgcolor=#ccffcc
| 44
| March 21
| @ New Orleans
| 
| Klay Thompson (27)
| David Lee (11)
| Nate Robinson (10)
| New Orleans Arena13,959
| 19–25
|- bgcolor=#ffcccc
| 45
| March 22
| @ Houston
| 
| Richard Jefferson (14)
| Dominic McGuire (6)
| Charles Jenkins (6)
| Toyota Center15,325
| 19–26
|- bgcolor=#ccffcc
| 46
| March 24
| Sacramento
| 
| Klay Thompson (31)
| David Lee (14)
| David Lee (9)
| Oracle Arena19,596
| 20–26
|- bgcolor=#ffcccc
| 47
| March 25
| @ Portland
| 
| Charles Jenkins (27)
| David Lee (16)
| Charles Jenkins (6)
| Rose Garden20,636
| 20–27
|- bgcolor=#ffcccc
| 48
| March 27
| L. A. Lakers
| 
| Lee, Rush (23)
| David Lee (9)
| Klay Thompson (7)
| Oracle Arena19,596
| 20–28
|- bgcolor=#ffcccc
| 49
| March 28
| New Orleans
| 
| David Lee (28)
| David Lee (7)
| Nate Robinson (6)
| Oracle Arena18,771
| 20–29
|- bgcolor=#ffcccc
| 50
| March 30
| New Jersey
| 
| David Lee (27)
| Dominic McGuire (9)
| Charles Jenkins (12)
| Oracle Arena19,596
| 20–30

|- bgcolor=#ffcccc
| 51
| April 1
| @ L. A. Lakers
| 
| David Lee (27)
| David Lee (6)
| Lee, Robinson (7)
| Staples Center18,897
| 20–31
|- bgcolor=#ffcccc
| 52
| April 3
| @ Memphis
| 
| David Lee (22)
| David Lee (13)
| Nate Robinson (5)
| FedEx Forum14,310
| 20–32
|- bgcolor=#ccffcc
| 53
| April 4
| @ Minnesota
| 
| David Lee (31)
| David Lee (8)
| Charles Jenkins (7)
| Target Center17,161
| 21–32
|- bgcolor=#ffcccc
| 54
| April 6
| @ Utah
| 
| David Lee (26)
| David Lee (12)
| Charles Jenkins (7)
| EnergySolutions Arena18,933
| 21–33
|- bgcolor=#ccffcc
| 55
| April 7
| Denver
| 
| Rush (20)
| David Lee (9)
| Charles Jenkins (8)
| Oracle Arena18,942
| 22–33
|- bgcolor=#ffcccc
| 56
| April 9
| @ Denver
| 
| Klay Thompson (17)
| Mickell Gladness (5)
| Nate Robinson (5)
| Pepsi Center15,530
| 22–34
|- bgcolor=#ffcccc
| 57
| April 11
| @ Portland
| 
| David Lee (21)
| David Lee (14)
| Nate Robinson (8)
| Rose Garden20,502
| 22–35
|- bgcolor=#ffcccc
| 58
| April 12
| Dallas
| 
| David Lee (30)
| David Lee (8)
| Klay Thompson (8)
| Oracle Arena17,929
| 22–36
|- bgcolor=#ffcccc
| 59
| April 14
| @ L. A. Clippers
| 
| Nate Robinson (28)
| Dominic McGuire (11)
| Nate Robinson (8)
| Staples Center19,060
| 22–37
|- bgcolor=#ffcccc
| 60
| April 16
| San Antonio
| 
| Nate Robinson (30)
| Jeremy Tyler (10)
| Nate Robinson (7)
| Oracle Arena18,471
| 22–38
|- bgcolor=#ffcccc
| 61
| April 18
| L. A. Lakers
| 
| Klay Thompson (17)
| Dorell Wright (7)
| Charles Jenkins (11)
| Oracle Arena18,547
| 22–39
|- bgcolor=#ffcccc
| 62
| April 20
| @ Dallas
| 
| Klay Thompson (26)
| Brandon Rush (8)
| Charles Jenkins (10)
| American Airlines Center20547
| 22–40
|- bgcolor=#ffcccc
| 63
| April 21
| @ Houston
| 
| Klay Thompson (24)
| Brandon Rush (7)
| Charles Jenkins (8)
| Toyota Center15436
| 22–41
|- bgcolor=#ccffcc
| 64
| April 22
| @ Minnesota
| 
| Charles Jenkins (24)
| Brandon Rush (9)
| Charles Jenkins (9)
| Target Center15872
| 23–41
|- bgcolor=#ffcccc
| 65
| April 24
| New Orleans
| 
| Klay Thompson (16)
| Jeremy Tyler (8)
| Charles Jenkins (10)
| Oracle Arena17598
| 23–42
|- bgcolor=#ffcccc
| 66
| April 26
| San Antonio
| 
| Dorell Wright (25)
| Jeremy Tyler (9)
| Dominic McGuire (8)
| Oracle Arena18124
| 23–43

Roster

Transactions

Trades

Free agency

Additions

Subtractions

References

Golden State Warriors seasons
Golden State Warriors
Golden
Golden